Félix Pérez (born 10 December 1951) is a Venezuelan sprinter. He competed in the men's 4 × 400 metres relay at the 1972 Summer Olympics.

References

1951 births
Living people
Athletes (track and field) at the 1972 Summer Olympics
Venezuelan male sprinters
Olympic athletes of Venezuela
Place of birth missing (living people)
20th-century Venezuelan people